Cheramakan (also Romanized as Cherāmakān and Charā Makān; also known as Charmakān and Chārmeh Kan) is a village in Qarah Chaman Rural District, Arzhan District, Shiraz County, Fars Province, Iran. At the 2006 census, its population was 169, in 36 families.

References 

Populated places in Shiraz County